These are the results of the 2011 African Weightlifting Championships. The event was held jointly with the 2011 Commonwealth Championships.

56 kg Men

62 kg Men

69 kg Men

77 kg Men

85 kg Men

94 kg Men

105 kg Men

48 kg Women

53 kg Women

58 kg Women

63 kg Women

69 kg Women

+75 kg Women

References 

2011 in African sport
2011 in weightlifting
African Weightlifting Championships
International weightlifting competitions hosted by South Africa